Eugene David Glynn, M.D. (February 25, 1926 - May 15, 2007) was an American psychiatrist, writer, and art critic. He is most famously known for his book Desperate Necessity: Writings on Art and Psychoanalysis, which was illustrated by his partner Maurice Sendak.

Life
Glynn was born in Passaic, NJ, and raised by his stepmother, Frieda Helman. A WWII Naval veteran, he attended college and medical school at NYU. He devoted his life to public health in New York, counseling patients, supervising psychiatric care, and training social workers. He was the Director of Clinical Services at the Youth Counseling League and a consulting psychiatrist for the Jewish Board of Family and Children's Services. His writings on psychoanalysis and art were published in Art News and The Print Collector's Newsletter.

Personal life
Glynn's partner, Maurice Sendak mentioned in a September 2008 article in The New York Times that he had lived with Glynn for 50 years before Glynn's death.

Death

Glynn died May 15, 2007, at the age of 81 due to lung cancer.

After Glynn's death, Sendak donated $1 million to the Jewish Board of Family and Children's Services in memory of Glynn.

References

External links
 
 
  Bermudez, Caroline (August 12, 2010). "Famed Children's Book Author Gives $1-Million for Social Services". The Chronicle of Philanthropy. XXII (16): 28.

1926 births
2007 deaths
Deaths from lung cancer
Jewish American writers